Virgo I is an extremely faint satellite galaxy of the Milky Way. It was discovered in the Subaru Strategic Survey. Virgo I has an absolute visual magnitude of -0.8 making it the least luminous galaxy confirmed thus far. The galaxy has a radius of 124 light years, (half light radius 38 pc) meaning that it is too big to be a globular cluster. Cetus II is dimmer, but too small to be classed as a galaxy. Virgo I is dimmer than Segue I, the previous dimmest known.

References

Astronomical objects discovered in 2016
Dwarf galaxies
Milky Way Subgroup
Virgo (constellation)